Orphans is a play by Lyle Kessler. It premiered in 1983 at The Matrix Theatre Company in Los Angeles, where it received critical and commercial success and won the Drama-Logue Award. The play has been performed by the Steppenwolf Theatre and on Broadway in 2013.

Production history
Orphans premiered at the Matrix Theatre in Los Angeles in August 1983, and featured Joe Pantoliano, Lane Smith and Paul Lieber.

In January through March 1985 the play was produced at Chicago's Steppenwolf Theatre, with direction by Gary Sinise and starring John Mahoney, Terry Kinney and Kevin Anderson. Sinise said the play "kicked" the three actors "off into the movie business." John Mahoney, who received the Derwent Award and Theatre World Award for his performance said that "Orphans affected people more than any other play I've ever done. I still get mail from it, I still get people stopping me on the street, and it's twenty years later."

After its Chicago run, the Steppenwolf Theatre Company production premiered Off-Broadway at the Westside Theatre, running from May 7, 1985 to January 6, 1986, with a replacement cast consisting of Steppenwolf member Gary Cole, Corey Parker and William Wise. 

Orphans was the first Steppenwolf production to be performed internationally in London, premiering in the West End at the Apollo Theatre in 1986. Albert Finney as Harold won an Olivier Award as Actor of the Year.

The Steppenwolf productions in London and the United States helped establish Kessler's status as a major American playwright as well as the company's signature "rock and roll" brand of theatre. 
 To help highlight the emotional intensity of Kessler's parable, they featured an assortment of compositions by Pat Metheny and Lyle Mays to be played in the background; the pieces have remained optional for every production since.

In 2005, Al Pacino did a workshop of the play at the Greenway Court Theatre, Los Angeles; Jesse Eisenberg and Southland's Shawn Hatosy co-starred.

Orphans made its Broadway debut at the Gerald Schoenfeld Theatre on April 7, 2013. The production, directed by Daniel Sullivan, starred Ben Foster as Treat, Tom Sturridge as Phillip and Alec Baldwin as Harold. The production closed on May 19, 2013 after 37 performances. The play received two Tony Award nominations, for Best Revival of a Play and Best Leading Actor in a Play (Sturridge). The production was originally slated to star Shia LaBeouf as Treat, but he departed the production during rehearsals after coming into conflict with Baldwin.
Orphans has reached many fans beyond the typical theater crowd, counting Lou Reed and Tom Waits among its most ardent admirers.

The play was adapted into a film of the same name. The film stars Matthew Modine, Albert Finney and Kevin Anderson.
 
According to Kessler, "The play has been done everywhere, from Japan to Iceland to Mexico to South America.... It just boggles the mind. It’s amazing: the evolution of the play and its reception in the world."

Synopsis 
Two grown orphan brothers live in an old dilapidated row house in North Philadelphia—deserted in childhood by an unfaithful father and by the death of their mother.

Older brother Treat, brutal and violent, provides for his younger brother Phillip by being a petty thief—interpreting the role of father.

With the love and protectiveness of an older brother and an orphan's fear of abandonment, Treat takes away Phillip's chances to grow up, depriving him of knowledge and forcing him to live in a world of illiteracy and innocence: relegating him to their lost childhood.

As Treat is out stealing to put food on the table, Phillip never leaves the house, thinking he will die from something outside because of a near deadly allergic reaction he had as a child.

Haunted by the death of their mother, he spends his time lying in her closet filled with unworn clothes. Curious about the world, he secretly attempts to understand things by watching reruns of The Price Is Right and underlining words in newspapers and old books he finds lying around.

Treat kidnaps and ties up a Chicago gangster named Harold. Harold, an orphan himself, with the prowess of an escape artist, loosens the ties that bind him, turns the tables around, and with gun in hand, puts himself into the role of teacher, healer and surrogate parent.

Critical reception 
A 1985 review of Sinise's production, by The Record, compared the play with the 1955 black comedy film The Ladykillers and the 1958 Italian criminal-comedy film Big Deal on Madonna Street and wrote, "while one might be tempted to chuckle at Kessler's old-fashioned dramaturgy, it's a fine example of its kind and gorgeously performed by a cast of three under the direction of Gary Sinise... Sinise has staged the piece in a realistic idiom with highly theatrical accents lifelike scenes that begin and end in tableaux, actors throwing themselves around like rag dolls, extravagantly long pauses..."

The play was described by The New York Times as "theater for the senses and emotions."

T.H. McCulloh of the Los Angeles Times wrote it is "just as wise and knowledgeable about the human condition" as Tennessee Williams and "also as theatrical as Williams. Kessler has something very important to say, and he says it in terms we can't ignore. The biggest message is that we need each other, and that's something the viewer can't ignore...."

Tony Adler of the Chicago Reader declared, "Lyle Kessler's unassuming tale of two nearly feral brothers and the mysterious businessman who befriends them was and remains among the most devastating things I've seen onstage."

John Simon wrote in the National Review, "The play was a synthetic contraption out of Pinter and Sam Shepard, but it worked as a showcase for energetic actors and a clever director."

The Miami Herald wrote about a 1986 production starring Judd Nelson that the play is "tense, moving and funny as anything you're likely to see." The reviewer said, "Orphans is woven from mysteries, contradictions and unanswered questions," and concluded, "Orphans is violent, shocking and profane. And it's wonderful."

Genre 

Lyle Kessler's Orphans, among many of his other pieces of literature, has been praised as a hybrid of 20th century realism, Pinter-esque absurdism, and Shakespearean tragedy, but in many ways it aligns itself better with the literary tradition of Magical Realism, a more prevalent genre in Latin American countries than in the North American theatre. The way Orphans can move from a hyper realistic state into a parable while still maintaining its emotional pull and deeply felt sense of reality goes well with what magical realism is understood to be—magical elements blended into a realistic atmosphere in order to access a deeper understanding of reality.

The American theatrical tradition tends not to embrace these perceived contradictions as readily. An expressionistic play is expected to be cerebral and conceptual, not visceral. A realistic play is expected to maintain the same logic that one sees in the outside world. But, like Franz Kafka, Kessler grasps for a reality that is felt within us but doesn't always obey the logic outside of its own prescribed universe.

Direction 

Orphans has been applauded for its lack of dependence on one particular theatrical approach. As said by Los Angeles Times critic Scott Collins when reviewing a Deaf West Theatre Company production in 1996, "Whatever the medium, the viewer finds it hard not to be drawn into the emotional journey..." This production of Orphans, by the first sign language theater in the western United States, went on to be a Critic's Choice from the Drama-Logue newspaper and Joseph Dean Anderson's performance as Phillip won him a 6th Annual Ticket Holder's Award under the New Discoveries category.

Further praise for Kessler's ability to create something with such flexibility, while still taking people on its "emotional journey," came from a 2007 production of Orphans at the Penguin Repertory Company in Stony Point, Rockland County, New York. The New York Times critic Sylviane Gold called the production a "splendid revival", and wrote: "...it is strange to say about a play that burst into New York from Chicago in 1985 on the strength of the testosterone-fueled acting of the Steppenwolf Theater Company" that it can be directed "with as much attention to the play's heart as to its fist."

In Japan, Orphans premiered in 1991 by a "Tokyo style" theater group, going on to have a nationwide tour and performing continually in theaters around Japan ever since, including the internationally renowned Kaze Theater Troupe. Its success illustrates the play's ability to harmonize with different theatrical variations as well as cultural traditions.

In Korea, it premiered in 2017. Its revival is in 2019, with 3 female actors playing Harold, Treat, and Philip. This is to be the first gender free version of Orphans.

The drama's ability to maintain its inherent emotional pull regardless of its theatrical approach is one of the reasons for its continued success.

References

External links
Orphans at Internet Broadway Database

1983 plays
American plays adapted into films
Magic realism plays
Off-Broadway plays
Orphans in fiction
Parables
Plays by Lyle Kessler
Plays set in Pennsylvania
West End plays